Joseph Kizzi (born 24 June 1993) is an English professional footballer who plays for Sutton United, as a defender.

Career
Born in London, Kizzi played youth football for Ridgeway Rovers and non-league football for Eton Manor, Enfield 1893, Waltham Abbey, Cheshunt, Wingate & Finchley, Billericay Town and Bromley, before signing for newly promoted Football League club Sutton United on 1 July 2021.

Honours
Sutton United
EFL Trophy runner-up: 2021–22

Individual
Sutton United Players' Player of the Year: 2021–22

References

1993 births
Living people
English footballers
Eton Manor F.C. players
Enfield F.C. players
Waltham Abbey F.C. players
Cheshunt F.C. players
Wingate & Finchley F.C. players
Billericay Town F.C. players
Bromley F.C. players
Sutton United F.C. players
Association football defenders
Isthmian League players
National League (English football) players
English Football League players